Kasim Edebali (born August 17, 1989) is a former German-American professional American football defensive end. He played college football at Boston College and was signed by the New Orleans Saints as an undrafted free agent in 2014.

Early years
Edebali, the son of Petty Officer 2nd Class Jonathan Stradford, and Turkish mother, Nesrin Edebali, grew up in Hamburg, Germany and played for the  Hamburg Huskies.  At age 18, he was recruited to play college football in Meriden, New Hampshire, where he attended Kimball Union Academy as part of the USA Football International Student Program, and played high school football for two years.  He attended Boston College where he redshirted his Freshman year and went on to earn a bachelor's degree in Communications and Germanic studies in May 2013. As a defensive end for the Eagles, he was a co-captain and earned All-ACC second-team honors as a senior.

College career
Edebali played 49 games for the Boston College Eagles, recording 166 tackles (88 solo), 11 sacks, 24.5 tackles for a loss, 15 pass defenses, four forced fumbles, and three fumble recoveries. As a senior, started all 13 games, recording 67 tackles (36 solo), 9.5 sacks, 15 tackles for a loss, three forced fumbles, two fumble recoveries and five passes defensed and was named All-Atlantic Coast Conference second-team by the league’s coaches as well as All-ACC third-team honors from the media.  Edebali was a co-captain his senior year.

Professional career

New Orleans Saints
On May 12, 2014, the New Orleans Saints signed Edebali as an undrafted free agent.  He earned a spot on the roster based on his pass-rushing and special teams abilities during preseason. Edebali earned his first two career tackles against the Dallas Cowboys on September 28, 2014. On October 27, 2014, Edebali notched his first two sacks along with a forced fumble in the Saints' victory against the Green Bay Packers. Edebali finished his rookie season with the New Orleans Saints recording a total of 22 tackles (15 solo). He also recorded two sacks, and one forced fumble.

Denver Broncos
On March 13, 2017, Edebali signed a one-year contract with the Denver Broncos. He was waived by the Broncos on November 14, 2017.

Detroit Lions
On November 15, 2017, Edebali was claimed off waivers by the Detroit Lions. He was waived by the Lions on December 13, 2017.

Los Angeles Rams
On December 20, 2017, Edebali signed with the Los Angeles Rams, but was released a week later.

New Orleans Saints (second stint)
On December 28, 2017, Edebali was claimed off waivers by the Saints.

Chicago Bears
On June 7, 2018, Edebali signed with the Chicago Bears. He was released on September 1, 2018.

Cincinnati Bengals
On November 20, 2018, Edebali was signed by the Cincinnati Bengals.

Philadelphia Eagles
On August 6, 2019, Edebali was signed by the Philadelphia Eagles. He was released during final roster cuts on August 30, 2019.

Oakland Raiders
On October 22, 2019, Edebali was signed by the Oakland Raiders, but was released eight days later.

Career Accomplishments
With 8.0 total career sacks Edebali is the all time German sacks leader in the NFL, topping former Indianapolis Colts defensive end and first round draft pick Bjoern Werner by 1.5 sacks.

Hamburg Sea Devils
In 2021, the Hamburg Sea Devils (named after the mostly unrelated NFL-Europe team) franchise of the new European League of Football, a venture founded by fellow Hamburgian and personal friend of Kasim Edebali Patrick Esume announced that Edebali would be playing for them in the upcoming 2021 ELF season.  Edebali extended his contract for another year with the Sea Devils on March 24, 2022.

References

External links
New Orleans Saints bio
Kasim Edebali profile, CBS Sports

1989 births
Living people
American football linebackers
American people of German descent
American people of Turkish descent
German people of Turkish descent
German players of American football
Boston College Eagles football players
New Orleans Saints players
Denver Broncos players
Detroit Lions players
Los Angeles Rams players
Chicago Bears players
Cincinnati Bengals players
Philadelphia Eagles players
Oakland Raiders players
Hamburg Sea Devils (ELF) players